Nothing but the Sun is a 2020 Paraguayan-Swiss documentary film created and directed by Arami Ullón. The film is about Mateo Sobode Chiqueno, an Ayoreo indigenous man from Paraguay who has been collecting Ayoreo voices for over 40 years by using a rudimentary tape recorder: stories, interviews, songs, and rituals. It was selected as the Paraguayan entry for the Best International Feature Film at the 94th Academy Awards.

Mateo Sobode Chiqueno tells the story of the Ayoreo People who were uprooted and relocated to settlements, how their land has been taken violently and they were forced to convert to Christianity. He seemed his culture disappearing as consequence, and made it his life work to capture and document the Ayoreo language, traditions, stories, religion, and way of life.

Reception
In the mind of the public, indigenous displacement, culture annihilation, and forced conversion to Christianity are historical themes that remain in the past. However, for the Ayoreo people, is the reality, as recent as the early 2000s. The film brings attention to a cruel and current affair, and started conversations that might raise awareness.

Nothing but the Sun was awarded by Fipresci (2021), Rencontres de Toulouse (2021).

Reviews
This film has been received positively in documentary film festivals. It has been awarded Best Feature Documentary Award in the Lunenburg Doc Fest (Canada), and BYDGOSZCZ ART.DOC.  
Film Critics have expressed as follows:
 "Nothing But The Sun (Apenas El Sol) offers a moving requiem for uprooted communities with no possibility of reclaiming the life they once cherished." − Allan Hunter 
 "Through a gaze imbued with poetry and respect, Arami Ullón drills deep down inside of her protagonists in search of the truth which lies beyond their words and can be found... truths which have been inscribed in their bodies despite their uprooting." – Georgia del Don  
 "I hope our government gets to know this film, about the life of the Ayoreo people and that it will also be known in other countries. I am Mateo Sobode Chiqueno."
 "Nothing But The Sun, the film deals with colonialism, the theft of land, and the destruction of an ancient culture. ”It is tackling some of the most urgent questions of our era but this all comes through in an artistically ambitious style." – Orwa Nyrabia

See also
 List of submissions to the 94th Academy Awards for Best International Feature Film
 List of Paraguayan submissions for the Academy Award for Best International Feature Film

References

External links
 
  The Ayoreo

2020 films
2020 documentary films
Paraguayan documentary films
2020s Spanish-language films
 Ayoreo-language films
Swiss documentary films
2020 multilingual films
Swiss multilingual films